Standesamt Budsin was a civil registration district (Standesamt) located in Kreis Kolmar, province of Posen of the German Empire (1871–1918) and administered the communities of:

Bud = Budsin; Cza = Czarnikau, Kr Czarnikau; Gra = Gramsdorf, Kr Obornik; Jan = Jankendorf; Kol = Kolmar; Mar = Margonin; Rit = Ritschenwalde, Kr. Wirsitz; Wil = Wilhelmstreu
Population data may be inaccurate (see German census of 1895).

External links 

This article is part of the project Wikipedia:WikiProject Prussian Standesamter. Please refer to the project page, before making changes.

Civil registration offices in the Province of Posen